Mehrdad Mirkiani  (born 1963 in Tehran) is an Iranian makeup artist and makeup designer.

Filmography
 Exodus (2020)
  Tale of the Sea (makeup artist)  2018
 Pig (2018 film) (makeup designer) 2018
  Bomb (makeup designer) 2018
  Jashne Deltangi (makeup designer) 2018
 Flaming (makeup designer) 2018 
  The Misunderstanding (makeup designer)  2018
  Isolation (makeup designer) 2017 
  I Motherhood (makeup designer) 2017
   Abba Jaan (makeup artist) 2017
 A Special Day (makeup artist) 2017 
  Majan (makeup designer) 2017
  Sara and Ayda (makeup artist) 2017
 The Salesman (2016 film) (makeup artist) 2016 
  50 Kilos of Sour Cherries (makeup designer) 2016
 Born in 1987 (makeup artist) 2016 
 A Dragon Arrives! (makeup artist) 2016
  A House on 41st Street (makeup artist) 2016
  Blind Side (makeup artist) 2016
 Breath (makeup artist) 2016 
 Lantouri (makeup artist) 2016
  Where Are My Shoes? (makeup artist) 2016
  There Will Be Blood on Wednesday (makeup artist) 2015
 Three Fish (TV Movie) (makeup artist)  2015
 Death of the Fish (makeup artist) 2015 
 Avalanche (makeup artist)  2015
 Confessions of My Dangerous Mind (makeup artist)  2015
 /II The Buffalo (makeup designer) 2015
  I Want to Dance (makeup artist) 2014
  We Have a Guest (makeup artist) 2014
 Withdrawal (Urgent Elimination) (Short) (makeup artist)  2014
  Nabat (makeup department head) 2014
 Che (2014 film)  (makeup designer) 2014 
  Angels Come Together (makeup artist) 2014
 I'm Not Angry! (makeup artist) 2014
  Snow (makeup artist) 2014
 Tales (film) (makeup designer) 2014 
 I Cherish My Home 2014 (Short) (makeup artist) (completed) 
   Barg Rizan (makeup artist) 2013
  A Cradle for the Mother (makeup designer) 2013
The Painting Pool (makeup artist)  2013 
  I Am a Mother (makeup designer) 2012
  Laboratory (makeup designer) 2012
  Someone Wants to Talk with You (makeup artist) 2012
  Hatred (makeup supervisor) 2012
  Kissing the Moon-Like Face (makeup artist) 2012
 Modest Reception (makeup artist) 2012
Kolah Ghermezi and Bache Naneh (makeup artist) 2012
  Mixed Pizza (makeup artist) 2011
 A Separation (makeup artist)  2011
  Felicity Land (makeup artist) 2011
 Gold and Copper (makeup artist) 2011 
  Leila's Dream (makeup designer) 2010
  Son of Adam Daughter of Eve (makeup artist)  2010 
 About Elly (makeup artist)  2009
  Heiran (makeup designer) 2009
 A Span of Heaven (makeup artist)  2008
 Khake ashena (makeup designer)  2008 
  The Magical Generation (makeup designer) 2007
 Ghaedeye bazi (makeup designer)  2007
 The Reward of Silence (makeup designer) 2007
  Being a star (makeup designer) 2006
  Setareh Mishavad (makeup designer) 2006
 Mainline (makeup designer) 2006 
Half Moon (makeup artist)  2006 
 Fireworks Wednesday (makeup designer) 2006
  In the Name of the Father (makeup designer) 2006
  Friday Evening (makeup artist) 2006
  Girl's Dormitory (makeup designer) 2005
 A Little Kiss (makeup designer) 2005 
  Spaghetti in 8 minutes (makeup designer) 2005
  Gilane (makeup designer) 2005
 Ghadamgah (makeup designer)  2004
 The Beautiful City (makeup designer)   2004
 Jayi baraye zendegi (makeup designer)  2003 
 Dancing in the Dust (2003 film) (makeup designer) 2003
  Pink (makeup designer) 2003
  Kolah Ghermezi and Sarvenaz (makeup designer) 2002
  The Pastry Girl (makeup designer) 2002
 Low Heights (makeup artist) 2002
Kolah ghermezi and Sarvenaz  (makeup artist) 2002
 Dead Wave (makeup designer)  2001
 The Mummy 3 (makeup designer) 2000 
 The Red Ribbon (makeup artist) 1999 
  The Legend of the Golden Hoopoe (makeup designer) 1998
 The Glass Agency (makeup artist) 1998

References

Sources
Mehrdad Mirkiani
19th Iran Cinema Celebration names winners
Best Makeup Artist
bfi
The Numbers - Where Data and Movies Meet
https://movie.douban.com/celebrity/1310478/

External links

1963 births
Living people
Iranian make-up artists